Lara Grice (born August 11, 1971) is an American actress, who has appeared in more than 50 movies, notable The Reaping (2007), The Final Destination (2009), Girls Trip (2017) and Body Cam (2020). On television, Grice had a recurring roles on Treme, Salem, Rectify, and Queen Sugar.

Grice was born in New Orleans, Louisiana. Grice began her career studying at the University of Dallas, where she earned a Bachelor of Arts in acting.

Filmography

References

External links
 

1971 births
Living people
21st-century American actresses
Actresses from New Orleans
People from New Orleans
American film actresses
American television actresses
University of Dallas alumni